Czapek & Cie. is a manufacturer of fine Swiss watches founded in 1845 in Geneva.  It is most noted for its bespoke timepieces manufactured for the European nobility in the 19th century.

Company Founder 

Franciszek Czapek was a Czech-born, Polish master watchmaker who arrived in Geneva, Switzerland in May 1832. Soon after, he gallicised his name, thus becoming François Czapek. In 1834 he created the firm Czapek & Moreau with local Swiss watchmaker Moreau, from Versoix. François Czapek married (October 22, 1836) Marie, the daughter of clock and watchmaker Jonas Pierre François Gevril de Carouge (1777–1854).

Czapek was the author of the first book on watchmaking ever published in the Polish language "Remarks on the watchmaking for the use of the watchmakers and the public" (Słów kilka o Zegarmistrzowstwie ku użytku zegarmistrzów i publiczności). The work was printed in 1850 in Leipzig.

Patek, Czapek & Cie. (1839-1845) 

On May 1, 1839, Antoni Patek and François Czapek established a six-year partnership in Geneva under the name of Patek, Czapek & Cie. This partnership produced some exceptional watches which are part of important horological collection (King Farouk Collection, Patek Philippe Museum) or auctions (Antiquorum, Christies, Bonhams, Sotheby's). Czapek was head of watchmaking (“Finisseur”) while Patek led the sales and the Company. As of July 1840, the firm came gradually to employ a half-dozen workmen. Several were Poles: Lilpop from Warsaw; Henryk Majewski from Lwów (Ukrainian Lviv); Siedlecki and Friedlein from Kraków. Approximately 200 watches were produced yearly.

After the dissolution, Patek established Patek Philippe & Co. with the new partner Adrien Philippe. Czapek founded Czapek & Cie. also with a new partner, Juliusz Gruzewski.

Czapek & Cie. (1845) 

In 1845 Francois Czapek founded Czapek & Cie. with a new partner, Juliusz Gruzewski  (1808–1865), a close friend of French Emperor Napoleon III (1808–1873). Czapek's new company flourished. He became watchmaker to the Court of the Emperor Napoleon III ('Fournisseur de la cour - Purveyors to the Imperial Court") and had an Atelier in Geneva, a shop in Paris, Place Vendome 28 (established 1850), and another in Warsaw (established 1854).

In 1855, Czapek & Cie. started supplying its watches to Emperor Napoleon III. Juliusz Gruzewski, Czapek's partner, was a personal friend of the Emperor a fact which no doubt allowed him to become watchmaker to the Imperial Court, supplying many of the watches that were given by him as diplomatic gifts.
Czapek's clientele has included Khedive Ismail Pasha of Egypt and the House of Golitsyn.

For unknown reasons, the company supposedly changed hands around 1869, possibly due to the illness or death of Czapek. Czapek's date of death is unknown. However a stem-winding pocket calendar watch (illustrated) contains a French inscription on the case inside translating as "Former Establishment Czapek and Company / No. 10630 / A. Chaillet Successor / 84 Rue du 4 Septembre / Paris".  In another area it is inscribed "1876 / Rudzicki".  This indicates that the business continued for some period after Czapek's departure.

Historic Watch Gallery

Czapek & Cie.’s Renaissance (2011 - )
In 2011, Xavier de Roquemaurel, a luxury marketing consultant and watch lover, Harry Guhl an art expert, and Sébastien Follonier, a watchmaker, came together to revive Czapek. The company was reestablished on October 21, 2011, by creating a first model, a design study Czapek Chronograph.
The Company was relaunched and its development funded by an unprecedented equity campaign in November 2015, raising over 2 million CHF and bringing together more than 100 watch lovers and entrepreneurs from around the world.
In an effort to remain as faithful as possible to Czapek's spirit and style, they created the first model of the collection based on the design of Czapek pocket watch No 3430 dating back to the 1850s. They adapted the dial design to modern standards and sizes and created a proprietary caliber, SXH1, in collaboration with Swiss movement maker Jean-François Mojon of Chronode, inspired by the original movement of the pocket watch. The architecture of the movement with its double open ratchets and double spring barrels is a modern interpretation of the original movement of the 1850s pocket watch, delivering the same 7-day power reserve.

As a further homage to the history of Czapek & Cie, they named this first collection, ‘Quai des Bergues’, which was the address on the Rhone banks of his first Atelier in Geneva.

References 

 Tellier, Arnaud, & Didier Chaponnière, Mélanie, Timepieces for Royalty, 1850–1910, by Patek Philippe, Geneva, Patek Philippe Museum, 2005 (192 pp.), pp. 14–15.
 Kathleen H. Pritchard, "Swiss Timepiece Makers 1775-1975", published by National Association of Watch and Clock Collectors, Inc., 1997 (C-107 - C108 pp.)
 Les Archives d'Etat de Genève (AEG), Czapek & Cie initial registration. 23 March 1847. AEG, Jur. civ, ccm 6, 91 pp.
 Zefix, SOGC, Heading Swiss Commercial Register
 Antiquorum, Czapek Lot descriptions
 Martin Huber & Alan Banbery, Montres de Poche Patek Philippe (second edition), 2005, 292 pp., pp 11–13 and 66.
 Philip Poniz, “Patek Philippe: The Forgotten Beginnings”, VOX Magazine, 2003, http://catalog.antiquorum.com/catalog.html?action=load&lotid=342&auctionid=40"

External links
Czapek & Cie, Official Website
Patek Museum
History of Patek Czapek & Cie
 

Swiss watch brands
Watch manufacturing companies of Switzerland
Manufacturing companies established in 1845
Swiss companies established in 1845